The Continental Edison is a French manufacturing and marketing company of electrical equipment established in 1882 by Thomas Edison.

History 

Continental Edison was established in 1882 by French investors in partnership with Thomas Edison with the goal of marketing electric illumination and other equipment based on Edison patents. The company has gone through several changes of ownership and was a manufacturing company up to 1971 when it stopped producing its own televisions and other home appliances, outsourcing production after that. Products sold under the name include refrigerators, dishwashers, washing machines, and televisions.

Timeline 

 1882 - Continental Edison founded

 1881-1958 - part of General Electric

 1958-1971 - owned by Compagnie Générale des Eaux (CGE)

 1971-1997 - owned by Thomson Multimedia

 1997-2002 - owned by Cofidur group, a French electronic subcontractor supplier

 1999 - diversifies into multimedia products for the TV, PC and the Internet

 December 2002 , Continental Edison taken over by the AIT YALA K&S group.

 2006 , the brand was bought by the Chinese group Xoceco

 2011 owned by the  French Casino Group. It is currently distributed almost exclusively by Cdiscount

References

External links 
 Continental Edison (current marketing company)

1882 establishments in France
Companies of France